The Hollywood Canteen operated at 1451 Cahuenga Boulevard in the Los Angeles, California, neighborhood of Hollywood between October 3, 1942, and November 22, 1945 (Thanksgiving Day), as a club offering food, dancing and entertainment for servicemen, usually on their way overseas. Even though the majority of visitors were US servicemen, the canteen was open to servicemen of allied countries as well as women in all branches of service. A serviceman's ticket for admission was his uniform and everything at the canteen was free of charge.

The Canteen was co-founded by stars Bette Davis and John Garfield.

The East Coast counterpart was the New York City–based Stage Door Canteen, which featured Broadway stars and was also celebrated in a film, Stage Door Canteen.

History
The various guilds and unions of the entertainment industry donated the labor and money for the building renovations. The canteen was operated and staffed completely by volunteers from the entertainment industry. By the time the canteen opened its doors, over three thousand stars, players, directors, producers, grips, dancers, musicians, singers, writers, technicians, wardrobe attendants, hair stylists, agents, stand-ins, publicists, secretaries, and allied craftsmen of radio and screen had registered as volunteers.

Stars volunteered to wait on tables, cook in the kitchen, and clean up. One of the highlights for a serviceman was to dance with one of the many female celebrities volunteering at the canteen. The other highlight was the entertainment provided by some of Hollywood's most popular stars, ranging from radio stars to big bands to novelty acts. On September 15, 1943, the one millionth guest walked through the door of the Hollywood Canteen. The lucky soldier, Sergeant Carl Bell, received a kiss from Betty Grable and was escorted in by Marlene Dietrich. Another lucky soldier, Herman Harney, got a chance to dance with Rosemary Lane of the singing Lane Sisters.

A Hall of Honor at the Hollywood Canteen had a wall of photos which honored the film actors who served in the military.

By 1944, the canteen had become so popular that Warner Bros. made a movie titled Hollywood Canteen. Starring Joan Leslie and Robert Hutton, the film had scores of stars, many of whom had volunteered at the real canteen, playing themselves.  It was directed by Delmer Daves, who also wrote the screenplay. At the time the canteen closed its doors, it had been host to almost three million servicemen.

Maria Riva, Dietrich's daughter, recalled an anecdote where Marlene Dietrich decided to wash dishes and was joined by Hedy Lamarr. Bette Davis quipped  "get those two krauts out of the kitchen!"

Davis is also credited with insisting that the Hollywood Canteen be fully integrated by race and sex, at a time when most other military canteens and USO venues practiced strict segregation. When this policy was initially rejected, she used her clout by threatening to quit unless it was implemented. In practice, most visitors still socialized by race, and servicewomen were typically relegated to the upstairs balcony area.

References to the Hollywood Canteen often erroneously give it the address of The Hollywood Guild and Canteen, which was located at 1284 North Crescent Heights Boulevard in a home owned by the estate of actor Dustin Farnum. It was here that Anne "Mom" Lehr provided meals and bunk beds for servicemen until the end of the Second World War. When the home was razed in 1948, news articles failed to distinguish between the two "Hollywood Canteens", leading to a lasting confusion.

The building where the canteen was located no longer exists; a parking garage and a building operated by CNN are now located on the site, which is just south of Sunset Boulevard.

Volunteers
Noted celebrities who donated their services at the Hollywood Canteen are listed.

Bud Abbott and Lou Costello
Iris Adrian
Fred Allen
June Allyson
Brian Aherne
Don Ameche
Eddie 'Rochester' Anderson
The Andrews Sisters
Dana Andrews
Eve Arden
Louis Armstrong
Jean Arthur
Fred Astaire
Mary Astor
Roscoe Ates
Lauren Bacall
Lucille Ball
Tallulah Bankhead
Theda Bara
Lynn Bari
Jess Barker
Binnie Barnes
Diana Barrymore
Ethel Barrymore
Lionel Barrymore
Count Basie
Anne Baxter
Warner Baxter
Louise Beavers
Wallace Beery
William Bendix
Constance Bennett
Joan Bennett
Jack Benny
Edgar Bergen
Ingrid Bergman
Milton Berle
Julie Bishop
Mel Blanc
Joan Blondell
Ann Blyth
Humphrey Bogart
Mary Boland
Ray Bolger
Beulah Bondi
William Boyd
Charles Boyer
Clara Bow
Eddie Bracken
El Brendel
Walter Brennan
Fanny Brice
Joe E. Brown
Les Brown
Virginia Bruce
Billie Burke
George Burns & Gracie Allen
Spring Byington
James Cagney
Cab Calloway
Rod Cameron
Eddie Cantor
Judy Canova
Kitty Carlisle
Jack Carson
Adriana Caselotti
Charlie Chaplin
Marguerite Chapman
Cyd Charisse
Charles Coburn
Claudette Colbert
Jerry Colonna
Ronald Colman
Betty Compson
Perry Como
Chester Conklin
Gary Cooper
Joseph Cotten
Noël Coward
James Craig
Bing Crosby
Joan Crawford
George Cukor
Xavier Cugat
Cass Daley
Dorothy Dandridge
Linda Darnell
Harry Davenport
Bette Davis
Dennis Day

Doris Day
Yvonne De Carlo
Gloria DeHaven
Dolores del Río
William Demarest
Olivia de Havilland
Cecil B. DeMille
Andy Devine
Marlene Dietrich
Walt Disney
Jimmy Dorsey
Tommy Dorsey
Irene Dunne
Jimmy Durante
Deanna Durbin
Ann Dvorak
Nelson Eddy
Duke Ellington
Faye Emerson
Dale Evans
Jinx Falkenburg
Glenda Farrell
Alice Faye
Louise Fazenda
Stepin Fetchit
Gracie Fields
Barry Fitzgerald
Ella Fitzgerald
Errol Flynn
Kay Francis
Jane Frazee
Joan Fontaine
Susanna Foster
Eva Gabor
Ava Gardner
John Garfield
Judy Garland
Greer Garson
Lillian Gish
James Gleason
Betty Grable
Cary Grant
Kathryn Grayson
Sydney Greenstreet
Paulette Goddard
Samuel Goldwyn
Benny Goodman
Leo Gorcey
Virginia Grey
Jack Haley
Margaret Hamilton
Phil Harris
Moss Hart
Helen Hayes
Dick Haymes
Susan Hayward
Rita Hayworth
Sonja Henie
Paul Henreid
Katharine Hepburn
Portland Hoffa
Darla Hood
Bob Hope
Hedda Hopper
Lena Horne
Edward Everett Horton
Marsha Hunt
Ruth Hussey
Betty Hutton
Frieda Inescort
Jose Iturbi
Harry James
Gloria Jean
Anne Jeffreys
Allen Jenkins
Van Johnson
Al Jolson
Jennifer Jones
Marcia Mae Jones
Boris Karloff
Danny Kaye
Buster Keaton
Ruby Keeler
Gene Kelly
Evelyn Keyes
Guy Kibbee
Andrea King
Gene Krupa
Kay Kyser
Alan Ladd
Bert Lahr

Elsa Lanchester
Angela Lansbury
Veronica Lake
Hedy Lamarr
Dorothy Lamour
Carole Landis
Frances Langford
Charles Laughton
Stan Laurel and Oliver Hardy
Peter Lawford
Gertrude Lawrence
Peggy Lee
Pinky Lee
Mervyn LeRoy
Vivien Leigh
Joan Leslie
Ted Lewis
Beatrice Lillie
Mary Livingstone
Harold Lloyd
June Lockhart
Anita Loos
Peter Lorre
Myrna Loy
Keye Luke
Bela Lugosi
Ida Lupino
Diana Lynn
Marie McDonald
Jeanette MacDonald
Fred MacMurray
Marjorie Main
Irene Manning
Fredric March
The Marx Brothers
Herbert Marshall
Ilona Massey
Victor Mature
Elsa Maxwell
Louis B. Mayer
Hattie McDaniel
Roddy McDowall
Frank McHugh
Victor McLaglen
Butterfly McQueen
Lauritz Melchior
Adolphe Menjou
Una Merkel
Ray Milland
Ann Miller
Glenn Miller
Carmen Miranda
Robert Mitchum
Maria Montez
George Montgomery
Grace Moore
Jackie Moran
Dennis Morgan
Patricia Morison
Paul Muni
Ken Murray
The Nicholas Brothers
Ramon Novarro
Jack Oakie
Margaret O'Brien
Pat O'Brien
Virginia O'Brien
Donald O'Connor
Maureen O'Hara
Oona O'Neill
Maureen O'Sullivan
Merle Oberon
Eugene Pallette
Eleanor Parker
Harriet Parsons
Louella Parsons
John Payne
Gregory Peck
Nat Pendleton
Mary Pickford
Walter Pidgeon
Zasu Pitts
Cole Porter
Dick Powell
Eleanor Powell
Jane Powell
William Powell
Vincent Price
Anthony Quinn
George Raft

Claude Rains
Vera Ralston
Sally Rand
Basil Rathbone
Martha Raye
Donna Reed
Bill "Bojangles" Robinson
Edward G. Robinson
Ginger Rogers
Roy Rogers
Cesar Romero
Mickey Rooney
Jane Russell
Rosalind Russell
Ann Rutherford
Peggy Ryan
S.Z. Sakall
Olga San Juan
Ann Savage
David O. Selznick
Hazel Scott
Lizabeth Scott
Randolph Scott
Toni Seven
Norma Shearer
Ann Sheridan
Dinah Shore
Sylvia Sidney
Phil Silvers
Ginny Simms
Frank Sinatra
Red Skelton
Alexis Smith
Kate Smith
Ann Sothern
Jo Stafford
Barbara Stanwyck
Craig Stevens
Leopold Stokowski
Lewis Stone
Gloria Swanson
Elizabeth Taylor
Shirley Temple
Danny Thomas
The Three Stooges
Gene Tierney
Lawrence Tibbett
Martha Tilton
Claire Trevor
Sophie Tucker
Lana Turner
Spencer Tracy
Gloria Vanderbilt
Lupe Vélez
Beryl Wallace
Nancy Walker
Ethel Waters
John Wayne
Clifton Webb
Virginia Weidler
Johnny Weissmuller
Orson Welles
Mae West
Bert Wheeler
Alice White
Paul Whiteman
Margaret Whiting
Cornel Wilde
Esther Williams
Warren William
Chill Wills
Marie Wilson
Shelley Winters
Jane Withers
Teresa Wright
Anna May Wong
Constance Worth
Jane Wyman
Ed Wynn
Keenan Wynn
Rudy Vallee
Lupe Vélez
Loretta Young
Robert Young
Darryl F. Zanuck
Vera Zorina

See also

 The Mercury Wonder Show

References

Defunct organizations based in Hollywood, Los Angeles
United States home front during World War II